Radiarctia melanochoria is a moth in the family Erebidae. It was described by Erich Hering in 1932. It is found in the Democratic Republic of the Congo and Rwanda.

References

Moths described in 1932
Spilosomina